Knysh is a Ukrainian-language surname. Notable people with this surname include:
Danylo Knysh (born 1996), Ukrainian football midfielder
Myhaylo Knysh (born 1983), Ukrainian sprinter
Olha Knysh (born 1995), former female alpine skier from Ukraine
Renald Knysh (1931–2019), Soviet and Belarusian coach in artistic gymnastics
Valentin Knysh (1937–2022), Russian politician
Volodymyr Knysh (born 1970), former Soviet and Ukrainian footballer

Ukrainian-language surnames